Thierry Burkhard (born 30 July 1964) is a French Army general. He served as the Chief of Staff of the French Army from 2019 until July 14, 2021, when he was appointed as the Chief of the Defence Staff. 
Burkhard has served in the 2ème REP and held command of 13e DBLE in Djibouti.

Early career 

In 1988, he was enrolled in Military Academy Saint Cyr. After a year of post-academy training, Burkhard graduated as infantry and was posted for continual service in the 2nd Foreign Parachute Regiment. He served from 1989 to 1997.

He served in the operations command in Iraq, as operations officer in the 4th Foreign Regiment, and with the Joint Staff of the Armed Forces of Guiana. He also served in Gabon and Chad, during the Yugoslavia Crisis, and during the civil war in Côte d’Ivoire. He also served in Afghanistan on two occasions, while he was still the deputy Communications Director of the Joint Staff. He was later promoted to the command of the 13e DBLE in Djibouti.

Commands 
Thierry Burkhard joined the Information and Public Relations Service of the Armed Forces in 2010. In 2013, he became the Joint Staff Communications Directorate Director, through which he was made the J3 of the French Joint Staff under National Intelligence as coordinator and adviser of military intelligence to the President in 2015 and the Inspector General of the Army. He was commander of the Operations Planning and Control Center. He was the Chief of Conduct in the Center for Planning and Conduct of Operations Paris before he rose to be in the commands. He later became the Chief of the French Army in July 2019.

References

Citations 

 
 
 
 
 
 

|-

1964 births
Living people
French generals
French military staff
French soldiers
Chief of the Defence Staff (France)
École Spéciale Militaire de Saint-Cyr alumni
Commandeurs of the Légion d'honneur
Commanders of the Ordre national du Mérite
Recipients of the Cross for Military Valour
Recipients of the Croix de guerre des théâtres d'opérations extérieures